The January 2017 North American ice storm was a major ice storm that impacted the Great Plains, Pacific Northwest, and American Midwest. During the storm, multiple U.S. states declared states of emergency, and icy road conditions caused traffic incidents and fatalities. It was Named Winter Storm Jupiter by the weather channel. An outbreak of 11 tornadoes also struck Texas, injuring two.

Meteorological history
In mid-January, an unusual surge of atmospheric moisture surged into northwestern Mexico associated with an upper-level low near California. This moisture began to move into the High Plains and Central United States by the jet stream ahead of the low late on January 13, and, with below-freezing temperatures at the surface in much of Oklahoma, northern Texas, and Kansas, freezing rain began to explode into existence. The frozen precipitation continued to blossom as the day progressed. The low began to inject the aforementioned moisture into the state of Texas and Oklahoma as it slowly moved east-northeastwards across the Baja California peninsula and across the northern Gulf of California throughout the day on January 14. Meanwhile, icy conditions continued in much of the Central United States.

By late on January 14, a surface low developed east of the upper-low as it moved swiftly towards the United States–Mexico border. The surface low, while intensifying, as a result of interaction with the incoming moisture, developed a squall line of thunderstorms along its cold front, as it and the upper-low emerged into the Southwestern United States. The entire storm system continued to push northeastwards through the state of Texas on January 15. In advance of the squall line that was moving rapidly to the east, scattered supercell thunderstorms popped up, and at one point during the nighttime hours, a tornado warning had to be issued for the Dallas–Fort Worth metroplex, a rare occurrence.

Preparations and impact

West

Oregon

The storm impacted Portland, Oregon on January 10, 2017. Blizzard conditions caused Interstate 84 to close between Troutdale, Oregon and Hood River, Oregon. Governor Kate Brown declared a state of emergency in Oregon, and the mayor Ted Wheeler declared a state of emergency for the city of Portland, Oregon on January 11. Downtown Portland received 11 inches of snow in a 12-hour period, making it the largest snowstorm for the city in twenty years. A basketball game between Portland Trail Blazers and Detroit Pistons was postponed.

California
On January 13, 2017, the storm caused snowfall in the mountains near San Diego.

Midwest

Missouri
On January 13, 2017, the storm covered Missouri with freezing rain, causing hazardous driving conditions and scattered power outages. Lambert Airport canceled most of its flights due to the ice. Missouri Governor Eric Greitens declared a state of emergency and called up the Missouri National Guard. The Missouri Department of Transportation reported that it responded to about 100 crashes on January 13, 2017. A woman from Crystal City, Missouri died while driving in on an ice-covered bridge. The start time of a National Football League divisional playoff game between the Kansas City Chiefs and Pittsburgh Steelers in Kansas City, Missouri on January 15 was changed from 12:05 p.m. CST to 7:20 p.m. CST due to the weather forecast.

On January 14, two more traffic fatalities were attributed to the effects of the storm. One man from Ravenwood, Missouri slid off the road while another man died in a pileup.

Kansas
The National Weather Service issued a winter storm watch for southern Kansas on January 11, 2017. In Dodge City, where  of ice accumulated, so many downed trees blocked roads that school buses could not run on January 18. The Kansas National Guard helped stranded motorists and provided emergency transportation on January 13, 2017. On January 14, the storm caused a pileup of 20 vehicles, causing two injuries. The Victory Electric Cooperative Association reported 5,800 power outages on January 15, of which 1,175 outages remained on January 18.

Nebraska and Iowa
The National Weather Service issued ice storm warnings on January 14, 2017 for southeastern Nebraska and southern Iowa. Residents in these areas were urged stay indoors during the storm and to prepare by buying food, water, and fuel.

Icy conditions contributed to a fiery crash between two semitrailer trucks on Interstate 80 near Kearney, Nebraska on January 15, and no injuries were reported. The University of Nebraska–Lincoln canceled classes on January 17 due to the road conditions. Since 2016 was an abnormally dry year for Nebraska, some local farmers appreciated the moisture from the storm.

On January 15, the storm left  of ice on some parts of Iowa, and hundreds of crews were sent to clear the roads.

Great Plains

Oklahoma
On January 12, 2017, Oklahoma Governor Mary Fallin declared a state of emergency. The next day, some schools and government offices were closed for the storm. Many Oklahoma residents responded to these warnings by buying groceries and generators. An accident in Weatherford, Oklahoma on January 14 left at least one person dead. Road conditions stranded several vehicles in Oologah, Oklahoma, and Interstate 40 was closed due to multiple accidents.

Texas

On January 15–16, the ice storm impacted Texas, creating severe storms and tornadoes in South Clifton and in the counties Bosque and Hill. In the end, 11 tornadoes were confirmed. After a January 15 NFL game between the Dallas Cowboys and Green Bay Packers at the AT&T Stadium, a tornado warning caused thousands to stay in the stadium until weather conditions improved.

See also 

 January 2007 North American ice storm
 December 2013 North American storm complex
 Early January 2017 North American winter storm
 Late December 2015 North American storm complex
 2017 California floods

References

External links 
 

2016–17 North American winter
2017 in California
2017 in Iowa
2017 in Kansas
2017 in Missouri
2017 in Nebraska
2017 in Oklahoma
2017 in Oregon
2017 in Texas
2017 natural disasters in the United States
Natural disasters in Colorado
Natural disasters in Oklahoma
Blizzards in the United States
Ice storms in the United States
January 2017 events in the United States
Tornadoes in Texas
Tornadoes of 2017